Khvosh Ab-e Shirin (also Romanized as Khvosh Āb-e Shīrīn, Khowsh Āb-e Shīrīn, and Khvoshāb-e Shīrīn; also known as Khvoshāb and Shīrīn) is a village in Kafsh Kanan Rural District, in the Central District of Bahmai County, Kohgiluyeh and Boyer-Ahmad Province, Iran. At the 2006 census, its population was 105, in 20 families.

References 

Populated places in Bahmai County